The 1888 Worcester Tech football team was an American football team that represented Worcester Polytechnic Institute in the 1888 college football season.  The team compiled a 1–5 record.

Schedule

References

Worcester Tech
WPI Engineers football seasons
Worcester Tech football